Senator Fox may refer to:

Andrew F. Fox (1849–1926), Mississippi State Senate
Chauncey J. Fox (1797–1883), New York State Senate
Fred L. Fox (1876–1952), West Virginia State Senate
James Augustus Fox (1827–1901), Massachusetts State Senate
John Fox (congressman) (1835–1914), New York State Senate
Nicole Fox (Nebraska politician) (born 1974), Nebraska State Senate
Roberta Fox (1943–2009), Florida State Senate
Sally Fox (1951–2014), Vermont State Senate

See also
Virginia Foxx (born 1943), North Carolina State Senate
Le Sénateur Fox (Senator Fox), a 2004 French film for which actress Catherine Rich was nominated for a Molière Award for Best Actress